The Portugal national under-23 football team (also known as Portugal Olympic football team) represents Portugal in international football competitions (final stage and qualifiers) in Olympic Games, as well as in under–23 football tournaments. The selection is limited to players under the age of 23, except three over-age players. The team is controlled by the Portuguese Football Federation (FPF). In three participations, Portugal's highest place was fourth, in 1996. This team also competed in the now-defunct Under-23 European Championship. The first time Portugal participated in the Olympic Football Tournament, they fielded main team players since the International Olympic Committee rules allowed to do so back then and in the 1980s, the team was composed of semi-professional players. The team currently qualifies in accordance to their under-21 team position in the UEFA Under-21 Championship. The results below comprise both the under-23 team as well as the Olympic team.

History

1928 Summer Olympics in Amsterdam
Portugal was invited to enter the 1928 Summer Olympics Football Tournament, which was, at that time, contested by the best national "A" teams in the world and, therefore, considered to be the best international footballing tournament until the FIFA World Cup started, two years later, in 1930.

The Portuguese team was drawn in the preliminary round against Chile for a place in the first round. After falling 2–0 behind, Portugal scored four goals, winning the game 4–2 in what was their first win away from home soil. After their fantastic win against Chile, they faced off Yugoslavia and won 2–1 thanks to a late goal in the 90th minute.

Egypt was the team that followed in the quarter-finals. Here the Portuguese adventure ended after a 2–1 defeat. In the following games, the Egyptians lost against Argentina 6–0 in the semi-final and Italy 11–3 for the bronze medal match, which bittered the players. This was the first tournament the Portuguese team had ever competed in.

1972 European U-23 qualifiers
Portugal was drawn to Group Five, along with Denmark, to play in a two-legged Play-off. After a 1–1 tie in Lisbon, the Portuguese lost the return leg in Aalborg 2–1, ending with a 3–2 aggregate result.

1974 European U-23 qualifiers
For the next tournament, Portugal was put in Group Six with Bulgaria. The playoff result was 2–1 (0–0 in the first leg in Porto and 2–1 in Pleven) for the Bulgarians.

1976 European U-23 qualifiers
With England and Czechoslovakia in Group One, Portugal ended second with three points (four less than England) coming from a win and a draw against the central Europeans (2–0 in Faro and 1–1 in Teplice). Both games against the English were loses (3–2 in Lisbon and 2–0 in London).

1984 Summer Olympics qualifiers
Portugal was to play in Subgroup A of Group Four with Israel and West Germany for a place in the second qualifying round. They finished second behind the Germans (six points) with four points. After an initial win (3–1 in Lisbon), they lost in Osnabrück 3–0, followed by a 1–0 defeat in Tel Aviv and a 2–1 win against the Israelis in Lisbon.

1988 Summer Olympics qualifiers
With strong sides to play with (East Germany, Iceland, Italy, and the Netherlands) the Portuguese qualification was seen has difficult. With wins against Iceland (2–1 in Leiria and 1–0 in Reykjavík), two away defeats (1–0 in Lecce, Italy and 3–0 in Aue, East Germany) and all other games tied, they ended up in third place with eight points (five behind group winners and qualifiers Italy).

1996 Summer Olympics in Atlanta
Portugal participated in the Atlanta Games and after a win over Tunisia (2–0) and 1–1 draws against Argentina and the United States, they ended in second place in Group A with the same points and goal difference as the first-placed Argentinians (but with lesser goals scored). Then in the quarter-finals, a win over France (2–1) after extra-time assured them a place in the semi-finals. Once again, they played against Argentina, but this time the South Americans won 2–0. For the bronze medal match, they faced a strong Brazil full of world stars such as Bebeto, Roberto Carlos, Ronaldo, Rivaldo, among others. Portugal was heavily defeated by a score of 5–0. This participation remains to this day as their best ever performance with a fourth-place finish.

2004 Summer Olympics in Athens
In the 2004 Games, the Portuguese were seen as major contenders for Olympic gold, but they didn't make it past the group stage. This disappointing performance started with a 4–2 defeat at the hands of Iraq. The second game ended in a 2–1 win over Morocco and in the third game, Portugal were once again defeated 4–2 by a minor team (Costa Rica).

Tournament history

Olympic

*Denotes draws include knockout matches decided on penalty kicks.
**Gold background colour indicates that the tournament was won.***Red border color indicates tournament was held on home soil.European U-23 Championship
 1972: Did not qualify. Finished 2nd of 2 in qualification group.
 1974: Did not qualify. Finished 2nd of 2 in qualification group.
 1976: Did not qualify. Finished 2nd of 3 in qualification group.

Players
Current squad
The following 18 players were selected to participate at the 2016 Summer Olympics.

Previous squads
2016 Summer Olympics squads – Portugal
2004 Summer Olympics squads – Portugal
1996 Summer Olympics squads – Portugal
1928 Summer Olympics squads – Portugal

Overage players in Olympic Games 

References

External links
 
1984 Olympic Qualification at rsssf.com1988 Olympic Qualification at rsssf.com''

European national under-23 association football teams
European Olympic national association football teams
Oly
Foot